Troitsa is the name of several rural localities in Russia.

Modern localities

Kaluga Oblast
As of 2012, two rural localities in Kaluga Oblast bear this name:
Troitsa, Yukhnovsky District, Kaluga Oblast, a village in Yukhnovsky District
Troitsa, Zhukovsky District, Kaluga Oblast, a village in Zhukovsky District

Khanty-Mansi Autonomous Okrug
As of 2012, one rural locality in Khanty-Mansi Autonomous Okrug bears this name:
Troitsa, Khanty-Mansi Autonomous Okrug, a selo in Khanty-Mansiysky District

Kirov Oblast
As of 2012, two rural localities in Kirov Oblast bear this name:
Troitsa, Belokholunitsky District, Kirov Oblast, a selo in Troitsky Rural Okrug of Belokholunitsky District
Troitsa, Podosinovsky District, Kirov Oblast, a selo under the administrative jurisdiction of Podosinovets Urban-Type Settlement in Podosinovsky District

Kostroma Oblast
As of 2012, two rural localities in Kostroma Oblast bear this name:
Troitsa, Nerekhtsky District, Kostroma Oblast, a selo in Prigorodnoye Settlement of Nerekhtsky District
Troitsa, Vokhomsky District, Kostroma Oblast, a selo in Belkovskoye Settlement of Vokhomsky District

Krasnoyarsk Krai
As of 2012, one rural locality in Krasnoyarsk Krai bears this name:
Troitsa, Krasnoyarsk Krai, a selo in Troitsky Selsoviet of Pirovsky District

Kursk Oblast
As of 2012, one rural locality in Kursk Oblast bears this name:
Troitsa, Kursk Oblast, a selo in Troitsky Selsoviet of Kursky District

Federal city of Moscow
As of 2012, one rural locality in the federal city of Moscow bears this name:
Troitsa, Moscow, a village in Voronovskoye Settlement of Troitsky Administrative Okrug

Moscow Oblast
As of 2012, three rural localities in Moscow Oblast bear this name:
Troitsa, Istrinsky District, Moscow Oblast, a village in Yadrominskoye Rural Settlement of Istrinsky District
Troitsa, Mozhaysky District, Moscow Oblast, a village in Borodinskoye Rural Settlement of Mozhaysky District
Troitsa, Yegoryevsky District, Moscow Oblast, a village under the administrative jurisdiction of the Town of Yegoryevsk in Yegoryevsky District

Nizhny Novgorod Oblast
As of 2012, one rural locality in Nizhny Novgorod Oblast bears this name:
Troitsa, Nizhny Novgorod Oblast, a selo in Shapkinsky Selsoviet of Bogorodsky District

Novgorod Oblast
As of 2012, one rural locality in Novgorod Oblast bears this name:
Troitsa, Novgorod Oblast, a village in Rakomskoye Settlement of Novgorodsky District

Perm Krai
As of 2012, one rural locality in Perm Krai bears this name:
Troitsa, Perm Krai, a selo in Permsky District

Pskov Oblast
As of 2012, two rural localities in Pskov Oblast bear this name:
Troitsa, Bezhanitsky District, Pskov Oblast, a village in Bezhanitsky District
Troitsa, Velikoluksky District, Pskov Oblast, a village in Velikoluksky District

Ryazan Oblast
As of 2012, two rural localities in Ryazan Oblast bear this name:
Troitsa, Korablinsky District, Ryazan Oblast, a selo in Troitsky Rural Okrug of Korablinsky District
Troitsa, Spassky District, Ryazan Oblast, a selo in Troitsky Rural Okrug of Spassky District

Smolensk Oblast
As of 2012, one rural locality in Smolensk Oblast bears this name:
Troitsa, Smolensk Oblast, a village in Beleninskoye Rural Settlement of Safonovsky District

Tver Oblast
As of 2012, three rural localities in Tver Oblast bear this name:
Troitsa, Kalininsky District, Tver Oblast, a village in Mednovskoye Rural Settlement of Kalininsky District
Troitsa, Rameshkovsky District, Tver Oblast, a village in Kiverichi Rural Settlement of Rameshkovsky District
Troitsa, Udomelsky District, Tver Oblast, a village in Ryadskoye Rural Settlement of Udomelsky District

Vladimir Oblast
As of 2012, one rural locality in Vladimir Oblast bears this name:
Troitsa, Vladimir Oblast, a village in Kolchuginsky District

Yaroslavl Oblast
As of 2012, two rural localities in Yaroslavl Oblast bear this name:
Troitsa, Danilovsky District, Yaroslavl Oblast, a village in Fedurinsky Rural Okrug of Danilovsky District
Troitsa, Lyubimsky District, Yaroslavl Oblast, a selo in Troitsky Rural Okrug of Lyubimsky District

Renamed localities
Troitsa, until 1904, name of Udomlya, a town in Udomelsky District of Tver Oblast